Thomas James Yardley (27 October 1946 – 20 November 2010) was an English first-class cricketer. He was a left-handed batsman, an occasional wicket-keeper and an even more occasional right-arm medium pace bowler (he bowled only eight overs in first-class cricket). He played for Worcestershire and Northamptonshire between 1967 and 1982.

References

External links
 
 

1946 births
2010 deaths
English cricketers
Northamptonshire cricketers
Worcestershire cricketers